is a railway station on the Kagoshima Main Line operated by JR Kyushu in Yahatahigashi-ku, Kitakyushu, Japan.

History
The linkup was achieved on 27 December 1902, with Yahata opened on the same day as one of the intermediate stations on the new track between Kokura and Kurosaki. When the Kyushu Railway was nationalized on 1 July 1907, Japanese Government Railways (JGR) took over control of the station. On 12 October 1909, the station became part of the Hitoyoshi Main Line and then on 21 November 1909, part of the Kagoshima Main Line. With the privatization of Japanese National Railways (JNR), the successor of JGR, on 1 April 1987, JR Kyushu took over control of the station.

Passenger statistics
In fiscal 2016, the station was used by 6,745 passengers daily, and it ranked 26th among the busiest stations of JR Kyushu.

References

External links
Yahata Station (JR Kyushu)

Railway stations in Fukuoka Prefecture
Railway stations in Japan opened in 1902